Ellis Ferreira and Patrick Galbraith were the defending champions, but Ferreira did not participate this year.  Galbraith partnered Brett Steven, successfully defending his title.

Galbraith and Steven won the title, defeating Tom Nijssen and Jeff Tarango 6–4, 6–2 in the final.

Seeds

  Luis Lobo /  Javier Sánchez (first round)
  Patrick Galbraith /  Brett Steven (champions)
  Lucas Arnold /  Daniel Orsanic (first round)
  David Adams /  Aleksandar Kitinov (first round)

Draw

Draw

External links
Draw

ATP Auckland Open
1998 ATP Tour